Ofu and Olosega are parts of a volcanic doublet in the Manuʻa Islands, which is a part of American Samoa in the Samoan Islands. Together, they have a population of about 500 people. Geographically, the islands are volcanic remnants separated by the narrow) Āsaga Strait, composed of shallow-water coral reef. Before 1970, people crossed between the two islands by waiting until low tide and then wading across the shallow water of the strait. Since 1970, there has been a bridge over the strait, providing a single-lane road that connects the two islands.

Pre-historic artifacts discovered on Ofu by archaeological field work in the 1980s significantly furthered  understanding of the ancient history of Ofu in particular, and the Samoa Islands and Polynesia in general. The artifacts include ceramics, adzes, and worked shell and bone pieces. Samples of red-slipped plainware ceramics were found that appear to have been crafted in the tradition of the Lapita culture. The field work, carried out by a team that included Pacific archaeology specialist Patrick Vinton Kirch, focused on a site called To'aga (site AS-13-1), a  coastal stretch on the south coast of Ofu. Dating of the artifacts suggested that Ofu has been continuously inhabited by humans for about 3,000 years.

Ofu 

Ofu is the western part of the volcanic outcrop of Ofu-Olosega Island and the westernmost of the Manu'a Islands. The main village of Ofu is located on the western shore, protected behind an offshore islet (eroded tuff cone) known as Nu'utele. Ofu has a small airport  and a boat harbor that serve the population on Ofu and Olosega.  The twice-weekly flight from Pago Pago takes about half an hour.

Most of the southern shore and associated coral reef are part of the National Park of American Samoa.

The island forms the Ofu County subdivision of the Manuʻa District. It has a land area of 7.215 km2 (2.786 sq mi), and had an official population of 176 persons as of the 2010 census.

Situated on the south coast of the island is To'aga lagoon which has a high diversity of corals and fishes. The marine site has been part of long term research and study on coral reefs and global climate change.

The island is also home to the Samoa Flying-fox (Pteropus samoensis), a species of bat threatened by habitat loss.

Olosega 

Olosega is the smallest island in the Manuʻa Islands. It is possible to walk across to Ofu Island at low tide. The name derives from Samoan ʻOlosega, "fortress of parakeets."

Olosega Island is a remnant of the Sili shield volcano, the caldera of which may lie submerged off the north shore.

The island forms the Olosega County subdivision of the Manuʻa District. It has a land area of 5.163 km² (1.993 sq mi), and had an official population of 172 persons as of the 2010 census.
  
There are four villages on Olosega: Olosega, Lalomoana, Sili, and Faiava.

Gallery

References

External links
 Office of the Governor. 2004. Manu‘a ma Amerika. A brief historical documentary. Manu‘a Centennial. 16 July 1904. 16 July 2004. Office of the Governor, American Samoa Government. 20 p.
 
 National Park Service map of the Manu‘a Islands
 Persistence of Coral Reefs Under Extreme Environmental Stress in American Samoa  G. Piniak, C. Birkeland, and G. Garrison (2004). University of Hawaii.

Islands of American Samoa
Mountains of American Samoa
Volcanoes of American Samoa
Polygenetic shield volcanoes
Manu'a